Olivier Aubin-Mercier (born February 23, 1989) is a Canadian mixed martial artist who competes in the Lightweight division of the Professional Fighters League. He formerly competed for the UFC until October 2019 when he became a free agent. A professional competitor since 2011, he was also on The Ultimate Fighter Nations: Canada vs. Australia.

Background
Born and raised in Montreal, Quebec, Aubin-Mercier began learning judo from a young age and was talented, earning a black belt, and was a two-time junior national champion as well as a three time senior national medalist. In addition, Aubin-Mercier also competed for the adult national Canadian team. Aubin-Mercier attended CEGEP for two years studying Multimedia.

Mixed martial arts career
Aubin-Mercier made his professional debut in 2011 and competed in regional promotions across Quebec.  He compiled a record of 4 - 0, finishing all of his opponents by submission in the first round before auditioning for The Ultimate Fighter.

The Ultimate Fighter: Nations 
In December 2013, it was announced that Aubin-Mercier would be a cast member on The Ultimate Fighter Nations: Canada vs. Australia, representing Canada at welterweight.

Over the course of the show, Aubin-Mercier first defeated Jake Matthews in the quarterfinals via unanimous decision.  In the semifinals, Aubin-Mercier went on to defeat Richard Walsh via submission (rear-naked choke) to reach the finals.

Ultimate Fighting Championship 
Aubin-Mercier made his official debut facing fellow castmate Chad Laprise in the welterweight finals on April 16, 2014 The Ultimate Fighter Nations Finale.  Laprise won the fight via split decision.

Aubin-Mercier faced Jake Lindsey in a lightweight bout on October 4, 2014, at UFC Fight Night 54.   Aubin-Mercier won the bout via submission in the second round, which also earned him a Performance of the Night bonus.

Aubin-Mercier faced David Michaud on April 25, 2015, at UFC 186. He won the fight via submission in the third round.

Aubin-Mercier was expected to face Chris Wade on August 23, 2015, at UFC Fight Night 74. However, Wade pulled out of the bout in late July after sustaining an injury and was replaced by Tony Sims. He won the fight via unanimous decision.

Aubin-Mercier faced Carlos Diego Ferreira on January 30, 2016, at UFC on Fox 18. He lost the fight by unanimous decision.

Aubin-Mercier next faced Thibault Gouti on June 18, 2016, at UFC Fight Night 89. He won the fight via submission in the third round.

Aubin Mercier faced Drew Dober on December 10, 2016, at UFC 206. He won the fight via submission in the second round.

Aubin-Mercier was expected to face Leonardo Santos on June 3, 2017, at UFC 212. However the bout was scrapped on May 18 as both fighters were removed from the card.

Aubin-Mercier faced Anthony Rocco Martin on September 16, 2017, at UFC Fight Night 116. He won the back-and-forth fight via split decision.

Aubin-Mercier was scheduled to face Gilbert Burns on February 24, 2018, at UFC on Fox 28. However, on February 21, 2018, the bout was scrapped as promotional medical officials deemed Burns would be unsafe to meet lightweight upper limit of 156 Ibs limit upon his arrival at the fight week.

Aubin-Mercier faced Evan Dunham on April 7, 2018, at UFC 223. He won the fight by TKO in the first round. This win earned him a Performance of the Night bonus.

Aubin-Mercier faced Alexander Hernandez on July 28, 2018, at UFC on Fox 30. He lost the fight via unanimous decision.

The bout with Gilbert Burns eventually took place on December 8, 2018, at UFC 231. Aubin-Mercier lost the fight via unanimous decision.

As the last fight of his prevailing contract, Aubin-Mercier faced Arman Tsarukyan on July 27, 2019, at UFC 240. He lost the fight via unanimous decision.

Professional Fighters League 
It was announced on early March, 2020, that Aubin-Mercier signed with Professional Fighters League.

2021 season 
Aubin-Mercier was expected to make his PFL debut against Joilton Lutterbach on April 23, 2021, at PFL 1. However, in March, he pulled out of the bout due to injury.

Aubin-Mercier faced Marcin Held at PFL 4 on June 10, 2021. He won the fight via unanimous decision, earning his first victory in the promotion.

Aubin-Mercier was scheduled to face Natan Schulte on August 13, 2021, at PFL 7. However on August 4, it was announced that Schulte whad to pull out of the matchup and was replaced by Darrell Horcher. At weigh-ins, Horcher weighed in at 159.25 pounds, missing weight by 3.25 pounds. The bout proceeded at catchweight and he was fined 20% of his purse, which went to Aubin-Mercier who won the bout via unanimous decision.

2022 season 
Aubin-Mercier faced Natan Schulte on April 23, 2022, at PFL 1. He won the close bout via split decision.

Aubin-Mercier faced 2021 PFL Lightweight Champion Raush Manfio on June 17, 2022, at PFL 4. He won the bout via unanimous decision.

Aubin-Mercier faced Alex Martinez in the Semifinals off the Lightweight tournament on August 5, 2022, at PFL 7. He won the bout via unanimous decision.

Aubin-Mercier faced Stevie Ray in the finals of the Lightweight tournament on November 25, 2022, at PFL 10. Aubin-Mercier won the fight by knockout in the second round and won the 2022 PFL Lightweight Tournament.

2023 season 
Aubin-Mercier will start off the 2023 season against Shane Burgos on April 14, 2023, at PFL 3.

Championships and accomplishments
Professional Fighters League
2022 PFL Lightweight Championship
Ultimate Fighting Championship
Performance of the Night (Two times)  vs. Jake Lindsey and Evan Dunham

Mixed martial arts record

|-
|Win
|align=center|17–5
|Stevie Ray
|KO (punch)
|PFL 10
|
|align=center|2
|align=center|4:40
|New York City, New York, United States
|
|-
|Win
|align=center|16–5
|Alex Martinez
|Decision (unanimous)
|PFL 7
|
|align=center|3
|align=center|5:00
|New York City, New York, United States
|
|-
|Win
|align=center|15–5
|Raush Manfio
|Decision (unanimous)
|PFL 4
|
|align=center|3
|align=center|5:00
|Atlanta, Georgia, United States
|
|-
|Win
|align=center|14–5
|Natan Schulte
|Decision (split)
|PFL 1
|
|align=center|3
|align=center|5:00
|Arlington, Texas, United States
|
|-
|Win
|align=center|13–5
|Darrell Horcher 
|Decision (unanimous)
|PFL 7 
|
|align=center|3
|align=center|5:00
|Hollywood, Florida, United States
|
|-
|Win
|align=center|12–5
|Marcin Held
|Decision (unanimous)
|PFL 4 
|
|align=center|3
|align=center|5:00
|Atlantic City, New Jersey, United States
|
|-
|Loss
|align=center|11–5
|Arman Tsarukyan
|Decision (unanimous)
|UFC 240 
|
|align=center|3
|align=center|5:00
|Edmonton, Alberta, Canada
|
|-
|Loss
|align=center|11–4
|Gilbert Burns
|Decision (unanimous)
|UFC 231 
|
|align=center|3
|align=center|5:00
|Toronto, Ontario, Canada
|
|-
|Loss
|align=center|11–3
|Alexander Hernandez
|Decision (unanimous)
|UFC on Fox: Alvarez vs. Poirier 2 
|
|align=center|3
|align=center|5:00
|Calgary, Alberta, Canada
|
|-
|Win
|align=center|11–2
|Evan Dunham
|TKO (knees to the body and punches)
|UFC 223
|
|align=center|1
|align=center|0:53
|Brooklyn, New York, United States
|
|-
|Win
|align=center|10–2
|Anthony Rocco Martin
|Decision (split)
|UFC Fight Night: Rockhold vs. Branch 
|
|align=center|3
|align=center|5:00
|Pittsburgh, Pennsylvania, United States
|
|-
|Win
|align=center|9–2
|Drew Dober
|Submission (rear-naked choke)
|UFC 206
|
|align=center|2
|align=center|2:57
|Toronto, Ontario, Canada
|
|-
|Win
|align=center|8–2
|Thibault Gouti
|Submission (rear-naked choke)
|UFC Fight Night: MacDonald vs. Thompson
|
|align=center|3
|align=center|2:28
|Ottawa, Ontario, Canada
|
|-
|Loss
|align=center|7–2
|Carlos Diego Ferreira
|Decision (unanimous)
|UFC on Fox: Johnson vs. Bader
|
|align=center|3
|align=center|5:00
|Newark, New Jersey, United States
|
|-
|Win
|align=center|7–1 
|Tony Sims
|Decision (unanimous)
|UFC Fight Night: Holloway vs. Oliveira
|
|align=center|3
|align=center|5:00
|Saskatoon, Saskatchewan, Canada
|
|-
|Win
|align=center|6–1
|David Michaud
|Submission (rear-naked choke)
|UFC 186
|
|align=center|3
|align=center|3:24
|Montreal, Quebec, Canada
|
|-
| Win
|align=center| 5–1
|Jake Lindsey
| Submission (inverted triangle kimura)
|UFC Fight Night: MacDonald vs. Saffiedine
|
|align=center|2
|align=center|3:22
|Halifax, Nova Scotia, Canada
|
|-
| Loss
|align=center| 4–1
|Chad Laprise
|Decision (split)
|The Ultimate Fighter Nations Finale: Bisping vs. Kennedy
|
|align=center|3
|align=center|5:00
|Quebec City, Quebec, Canada
|
|-
| Win
|align=center| 4–0
|Jason Meisel
| Submission (rear-naked choke) 
|Challenge MMA 22
|
|align=center|1
|align=center|1:38
|Montreal, Quebec, Canada
|
|-
| Win
|align=center| 3–0
|Jordan Jewell
| Submission (rear-naked choke)
|Slamm 1
|
|align=center|1
|align=center|1:53
|Montreal, Quebec, Canada
|
|-
| Win
|align=center| 2–0
|Daniel Ireland
| Submission (rear-naked choke)
|Ringside MMA 13
|
|align=center|1
|align=center|1:10
|Montreal, Quebec, Canada
|
|-
| Win
|align=center| 1–0
|Teoscar Hernandez
| Submission (rear-naked choke)
|Ringside MMA 12
|
|align=center|1
|align=center|0:58
|Montreal, Quebec, Canada
|
|-

Mixed martial arts exhibition record

|-
|Win
|align=center| 2-0
| Richard Walsh
| Submission (rear-naked choke)
| The Ultimate Fighter Nations: Canada vs. Australia
|April 2, 2014 (airdate)
|align=center|1
|align=center|N/A
|Quebec City, Quebec, Canada
| 
|-
|Win
|align=center| 1–0
| Jake Matthews
| Decision (unanimous)
| The Ultimate Fighter Nations: Canada vs. Australia
|February 27, 2014 (airdate)
|align=center|2
|align=center|5:00
|Quebec City, Quebec, Canada
|

See also
 List of current PFL fighters
 List of male mixed martial artists
 List of Canadian UFC fighters

References

External links
 Olivier Aubin-Mercier at PFL
 
 

1989 births
Living people
Canadian male mixed martial artists
Lightweight mixed martial artists
Mixed martial artists utilizing judo
Mixed martial artists utilizing taekwondo
Mixed martial artists utilizing Brazilian jiu-jitsu
Sportspeople from Montreal
Canadian male taekwondo practitioners
Canadian male judoka
Canadian practitioners of Brazilian jiu-jitsu
People awarded a black belt in Brazilian jiu-jitsu
Ultimate Fighting Championship male fighters